Bixby may refer to:

People
Bixby (surname)
Bixby family, a prominent southern California family
Bixby, character in Dominion

Places
Bixby, Minnesota, an unincorporated community
Bixby, Missouri, an unincorporated community
Bixby, Oklahoma, a city
Bixby, South Dakota, a ghost town
Bixby, Texas, a census-designated place
Bixby Knolls, California, a neighborhood in Long Beach
Bixby State Preserve, Iowa
Bixby, Nevada, a fictional town in the Tremors franchise.

Technology
Bixby (virtual assistant)

Other uses
Bixby, a Beanie Baby bear produced by Ty, Inc.
Bixby Creek Bridge, an arch bridge in Big Sur, California
The Bixby land companies, ranching and land-development companies in California
The Bixby letter, written by Abraham Lincoln
Bixby Medical Center, a public hospital in Adrian, Michigan
Bixby Ranch, an alternative name for Rancho Los Alamitos, California
Bixby Shinola shoe polish and Bixby Bicycle by the same company
AMD's Bixby chipset architecture codename.

See also
 "Mrs. Bixby and the Colonel's Coat", 1959 short story by Roald Dahl
 Bigsby (disambiguation)